Operation Strangle may refer to:
 Operation Strangle (World War II)
 Operation Strangle (Korean War)